Medford is a town in Taylor County, Wisconsin, United States. The population was 2,216 at the 2000 census. The City of Medford lies mostly within the town boundaries.

Geography
According to the United States Census Bureau, the town has a total area of 37.8 square miles (97.8 km2), of which, 37.7 square miles (97.6 km2) of it is land and 0.1 square miles (0.2 km2) of it (0.19%) is water.

History
The western edge of the six by seven mile rectangle that would become the town of Medford was first surveyed in 1847 by a crew working for the U.S. government. That west edge of the town is on the Fourth Principal Meridian, the first north-south line surveyed up through the forests of Wisconsin, from which all the towns, sections and forties are measured. In late 1861 a different crew of surveyors marked all the section corners in the township, walking through the woods and swamps, measuring with chain and compass.  When done, the deputy surveyor filed this general description:
The Surface of this Township is rather(?) gently rolling or Level.  Timber mostly Hemlock with (?) Birch (?) Sugar Fir(?) Spruce and White Pine. Soil 1st & 2nd Rate and of good quality for agricultural purposes. The Township is well watered by numerous(?) Small Streams which flow in a Southerly direction.

When Taylor County was formed in 1875, Medford was six miles north to south same as today, but it spanned the full width of the county, including all modern towns from Aurora to Goodrich.

Demographics
As of the census of 2000, there were 2,216 people, 821 households, and 637 families residing in the town. The population density was 58.8 people per square mile (22.7/km2).  There were 846 housing units at an average density of 22.4 per square mile (8.7/km2). The racial makeup of the town was 98.24% White, 0.09% Black or African American, 0.14% Native American, 0.41% Asian, 0.27% from other races, and 0.86% from two or more races. 0.23% of the population were Hispanic or Latino of any race.

There were 821 households, out of which 40.7% had children under the age of 18 living with them, 67.5% were married couples living together, 6.6% had a female householder with no husband present, and 22.3% were non-families. 18.0% of all households were made up of individuals, and 5.6% had someone living alone who was 65 years of age or older. The average household size was 2.70 and the average family size was 3.09.

In the town, the population was spread out, with 29.0% under the age of 18, 6.5% from 18 to 24, 32.0% from 25 to 44, 22.1% from 45 to 64, and 10.3% who were 65 years of age or older. The median age was 37 years. For every 100 females, there were 105.6 males. For every 100 females age 18 and over, there were 103.6 males.

The median income for a household in the town was $46,912, and the median income for a family was $51,188. Males had a median income of $30,680 versus $23,935 for females. The per capita income for the town was $20,261. About 3.4% of families and 4.3% of the population were below the poverty line, including 5.1% of those under age 18 and 6.2% of those age 65 or over.

References

Towns in Taylor County, Wisconsin
Towns in Wisconsin